Sątopy may refer to the following places in Poland:
 Sątopy, Greater Poland Voivodeship, village in the administrative district of Gmina Nowy Tomyśl
 Sątopy, Warmian-Masurian Voivodeship, village in the administrative district of Gmina Bisztynek